Phil Hobden (born 14 August 1976 in Lewes, England) is a filmmaker and writer based in the South of England. He is also notable as a screenwriter, film producer, journalist and media campaigner. Hobden is the co-founder of Independent production company Modern Life? and has been responsible for the DVD release of numerous films through his distribution sales company Pulp Movies.

As a filmmaker 

Hobden's first film role was on the 1993 Indie British film Project:Assassin (aka New Blood), directed by Mike Hurst and Andy Hurst.

From 1993 to 2001, Hobden with partner Ross Boyask was involved in the production of almost 40 short films.

1993 saw Hobden's first short film The Gauntlet completed. Starring Glenn Salvage and Tom Hay, the film was sent by the filmmakers to Jackie Chan. Chan wrote back commenting... "Good try. Keep going...".

1995 saw short film Boyz Gone Bad win Best Short film at the Brighton Short Film Festival.

In 1998 short film Lone Wolf was screened, in an edited version, On Channel 4 in the UK.

In 1998/9 he saw his first feature film in development, the darkly comic 'Brighton Born, Brighton Dead' which sat with Miramax UK for over 2 years. Eventually the relationship broke down and the screenplay was lost into development hell. It remains unproduced to this day.

In 1999 Hobden won awards for Best Editing and Best Writing for his short film Blue Eyes at the RedTape festival.

In 2000/2001 Hobden was offered the chance to work on the Dave Courtney gangster action film Hell to Pay alongside its original director Ross Boyask but turned it down, instead focusing on setting up his own business, the media production company Modern Life?

In 2001 short film Pure Vengeance, starring Scott Adkins (Bourne Ultimatum, Sheppard), Brendan Carr (Love Struck, Ten dead men) and Gordon Alexander (Accidental Spy, The Purifiers) was screened on the Jonathan Ross BBC2 show Stop Kung Fu.

In 2009 Hobden was credited as associate producer on UK action film Unarmed But Dangerous aka Kung Fu Flid, which starred Mat Fraser and Faye Tozer.

In 2010 Hobden was credited as associate producer on UK horror film Cut featuring Gremlins star Zach Galligan and UK model Danielle Lloyd.

Left For Dead

In 2002 Hobden started work on his first feature film, the low-budget martial arts action feature Left for Dead.

Starring Glenn Salvage and newcomer Andy Prior, the film features cameos by Joey Ansah (Bourne Ultimatum), Brendan Carr, Cecily faye and Cage Rage fighter Jeremy Bailey. Finished in late 2004, the film was shot for under £10k UKP and has been released in over 15 countries to date, including the UK, Canada, US, Thailand and others. The film was Released in the US to positive reviews in September 2005 and then eventually in the UK in March 2007.

Left for Dead was acquired for broadcast on Sky channel Movies4Men in late 2007. However Movies4Men sesequently decided the film was too violent and opted NOT to screen the movie.

Ten Dead Men

Hobden's second film was the action thriller Ten Dead Men. Again directed by Boyask the film stars Brendan Carr, Pooja Shah, former Steps singer Lee Latchford-Evans, JC Mac, Doug Bradley and Terry Stone.

Ten dead men sees Brendan Carr star as Ryan, a former killer gone straight who is dragged violently back into the life he left behind... with brutal and bloody consequences.

Ryan has spent years putting his brutal past behind him. A different man now to the stone cold killer he was a lifetime ago. But when an old face from the past arrives on his doorstep, Ryan is called upon to repay a blood debt from years ago. But the price is too high. Betrayed, and with his life falling apart around him, Ryan goes on a murderous, bloody revenge spree against the Ten Men who took his life away from him. Ten men took away his life. Now Ten Men Will Pay. Ten Dead Men is a pulse pounding British action feature, brought to you by the team behind the cult international success 'Left For Dead'.

The action sequences were 2nd Unit directed by Jude Poyer (28 Weeks Later, Hitman starring Jet Li) and the film was executive produced by Audtralian producer David Hannay (of Stone and The Man From Hong Kong fame) and US sales agent/producer Anthony I Ginnane.

Ten dead men has been released in France, Indonesia, Japan, UK, US UK and Germany as well as other smaller releases.

Additional projects

Hobden has also been involved in several non filmmaking projects. These have included:

Pulp Movies distribution

In 2008 Hobden, through an associated company called Pulp Movies, was responsible for the UK DVD releases of UK action films The Silencer and Infestation through collaboration with leading UK Independent DVD distributor Blackhorse Entertainment.

However, in late 2008 Blackhorse Entertainment become insolvent and ceased trading. As part of the liquidation of assets, and in association with Cornerstone Media (a new company that consisted of several former Blackhorse employees), Pulp Movies acquired the distribution rights and remaining stock to both Infestation and The Silencer. Furthermore, Pulp Movies obtained the rights to Hobden's own film, Left for Dead, and that of James Eaves’ The Witches Hammer.

All four were released under the Cornerstone Media banner via retailers such as HMV and Zavvi.

In 2010 Hobden and Pulp Movies were responsible for the sale of UK independent horror film CUT to BritFilms.Tv, the distributor for Hobden's own Ten Dead Men, which saw the film released on DVD in leading retailers such as Amazon, HMV, ASDA and Sainsbury on 22 February 2010

Night Warrior graphic novel
Modern Life? have numerous additional interests: From highly regarded martial arts action comic book, Night Warrior (www.nw-comic.co.uk) which is based on a short film made by Modern Life? in 1994 to PulpMovies.co.uk in which Modern Life? has been responsible for releasing UK films Infestation and The Silencer, in partnership with UK studio Blackhorse Entertainment.

Phil Hobden is also working as a co-producer on the film Kung Fu Flid, being executive produced by Ten dead men actor & associate producer Terry Stone and featuring former Steps star Faye Tozer as well as UK film Cut

As a writer

Hobden has been the Film News and Review Editor for Combat Magazine since 2007 where he regularly writes a column called Combat Film that looks at Action film related topics. Such topics have included "The Top 10 Worst Named Martial Arts Movies" & "Assassins, Mummy's & Superheroes"

Quotes from Combat Film have appeared on DVD covers for films such as Confucius, Merantau Warrior, Sinking of Japan, IP Man 2 and House of the Rising Sun.

From 2006 to 2011 Hobden has also written for Impact, Vengeance, KungFuCinema.Com, Bloody-Disgusting.com, FareastFilms.com as well as his own film review site 'Phil's Quick Capsule Review'.

Hobden has interviewed actors such as Dolph Lundgren, JeeJa Yanin, Stephen M.D. Chang, Danny Trejo, Sho Kosugi, Loren Avedon, Matthias Hues, Jeff Wincott, Darren Shahlavi as well as up-and-coming stars such as Glenn Salavge and Brendan Carr.

Hobden has also interviewed behind the scenes talent such as Hollywood stunt co-ordinator Loren Janes (see Bullitt), director Michael Hurst (New Blood, House of The Dead 2) stunt and fight coordinators such as Jeff Imada (They Live; Heroes) and Jude Poyer (28 Weeks Later; Ten dead men) as well as casting director Mike Leeder (Rush Hour 3) and award-winning screenfight/martial arts photographer Mike Holdsworth.

A noted MMA Fan, Hobden has also interviewed Strikeforce and Pride Fighting Championships commentator Stephen Quadros and WEC/UFC fighter Brad Pickett.

Currently Hobden writes for TKOaction website at www.tkoaction.com, focusing on Cult & rarely seen films across action, martial arts & sci-fi genre.

Filmsploitation: The Film Podcast 

In September 2011, Phil Hobden launched the Filmsploitation Podcast – a film, news and reviews podcast co-hosted by Richard Blanchette for episodes 1–25 and Andrew Mackay from episode 25 onwards.    With alternating guest hosts, the podcast is seen by many as the successor to the phenomenally popular AMR Movie Show, also co-hosted by Richard Blanchette.

The format includes news, run down of the UK Box office Top Ten, a feature Story, Reviews section, Cult Film (where the guest host (s) is required to pick a cult movie) and TV talk.  The podcast has been available on iTunes from Episode No. 1 and via the website at www.thefilmpodcast.co.uk

So far guest hosts have included filmmaker Ross Boyask, filmmaker & AMR Movie host Andrew MacKay, writer Chris Regan, Matt Duddy and Scolls Podcast member Dion Winton-Polak.

The podcast has also interviewed Danny Trejo, Phil Davies, UK producer Jonathan Sothcott, Michael Biehn, Jennifer Blanc-Biehn and Lloyd Kauffman

The podcast is produced every two weeks.

Ross And Phil Talk Movies 

In 2017, Phil Hobden launched the Ross And Phil Talk Movies podcast alongside long time friend and award winning film director Ross Boyask. The podcast is hosted as part of www.philsquickreview.co.uk.  

The podcast is produced every two weeks on average.

Press

Phil Hobden, his company Modern Life? and his films (including Left for Dead and Ten Dead Men) on various news sources from the BBC and recently on the 'BBC Film Network', Sky TV, Combat & Impact Magazines and numerous local newspapers.

Retirement From filmmaking 

On 9 July 2011 a message on the Modern Life web site a post entitled "And Now The End Is Here..." announced the retirement of Phil Hobden from filmmaking.

Whilst he has stopped making films, Hobden still writes for Combat Magazine and produces the Filmsploitation Podcast.

Martial Arts Hall of Fame  

In 2011 Hobden was inducted into the Combat Magazine Martial Arts Hall of Fame for Services to the Martial Arts Industry.

Filmography
Released Films

References

External links
 
'Phil Hobden' Official site

Living people
1976 births
British film producers
Alumni of the University of Brighton